West Warren is a census-designated place (CDP) and village in the town of Warren, Worcester County, Massachusetts, United States.

West Warren was first listed as a CDP prior to the 2020 census.

Demographics

References 

Census-designated places in Worcester County, Massachusetts
Census-designated places in Massachusetts